The 2017 Campeonato Mineiro is the 103nd season of Mineiro's top professional football league. The competition began on January 28 and will end in May.

Teams

América
América TO
Atlético Mineiro
Caldense
Cruzeiro
Democrata GV
Tombense
Tricordiano
Tupi
Uberlândia
URT
Villa Nova

First stage

Knockout stage

Goalscorers

References

Campeonato Mineiro seasons
Mineiro